Emmanuelle Gagliardi (born 9 July 1976) is a retired Swiss tennis player.

She was coached by Marco Tarelli and her preferred surface was hardcourt.

Gagliardi never won a WTA Tour singles title, but reached the semifinals of the 2002 Indian Wells Masters, losing to eventual champion Daniela Hantuchová, in three sets. She was a member of the Switzerland Fed Cup team that reached the final in 1998. She was also a member of the Swiss team for the 2008 Summer Olympics and played doubles with Patty Schnyder, reaching the second round. She has not been active on the WTA Tour ever since.

In doubles, Gagliardi reached the semifinals of the 2003 Australian Open with Petra Mandula and won the 2004 China Open, a Premier tournament, with Dinara Safina.

Grand Slam singles performance timeline

WTA career finals

Doubles: 10 (4 titles, 6 runner-ups)

Mixed doubles: 1 title

ITF Circuit finals

Singles: 9 (8–1)

Doubles: 9 (6–3)

Unplayed final

References

External links
 
 
 

1976 births
Living people
Swiss female tennis players
Monegasque female tennis players
Tennis players at the 2008 Summer Olympics
Olympic tennis players of Switzerland
Swiss expatriates in Monaco
People from Monte Carlo
Tennis players from Geneva